Bekić is a Serbo-Croatian surname. Notable people with the surname include:

 Almir Bekić (born 1989), Bosnian footballer
 Andrea Bekić (born 1965), Croatian diplomat
 Darko Bekić (born 1946), Croatian historian and diplomat
 Dejan Bekić (1944–1967), former Serbian footballer
 Hans Bekić (1936-1982), author of Bekić's theorem

Bosnian surnames
Croatian surnames
Serbian surnames
Patronymic surnames